Tali is a neighbourhood located in Pitäjänmäki district of Western Helsinki, Finland.

, Tali has 1,078 inhabitants living in an area of 1.01 km2.

The race track hosted the steeplechase eventing equestrian competition for the 1952 Summer Olympics.

References

1952 Summer Olympics official report. p. 58.

Venues of the 1952 Summer Olympics
Olympic equestrian venues
Pitäjänmäki